Arthur Martin Dinaux (8 September 1795 – 15 May 1864) was a French journalist and antiquarian.

Dinaux was born in Valenciennes. In 1822 he proposed excavation at the village of Famars, resulting in the discovery of over 30,000 Roman silver medals.

Works
 Les trouvères cambrésiens, 1836.
 Les trouvères de la Flandre et du Tournaisis, 1839.
 Les trouvères artésiens, 1843.
 Les trouvères : brabançons, hainuyers, liégeois et namurois, 1863.
 Les sociétés badines, bachiques, littéraires et chantantes, leur histoire et leurs travaux, ed. by Pierre Gustave Brunet, 1867.

References

1795 births
1864 deaths
People from Valenciennes
19th-century French journalists
19th-century French historians
Corresponding members of the Académie des Inscriptions et Belles-Lettres
French antiquarians
French male non-fiction writers